Great Britain did not send a team to the 1904 Summer Olympics in St. Louis, Missouri, United States.  Numerous events were contested, of which only some were later recognised by the IOC as official Olympic events.  Within these, three athletes representing Ireland participated, winning one gold and one silver medal;  since Ireland was part of the United Kingdom at the time, the IOC accordingly classifies these athletes as British.

With this classification, it should be mentioned that Tom Kiely, who won gold in the all-around athletics event, refused offers of a free trip and reimbursement of travel expenses from British and American officials, paid his own way, and was insistent that he represented Ireland.

John Holloway had emigrated from Bansha to the U.S. some years previously and, like Kiely, wore a green singlet with a shamrock while competing. Holloway is counted as British by some statistics, whereas the Irish Whales (who represented U.S. clubs) are counted as American.

Medallists

Results by event

Athletics

References
Lucas
Spalding

Nations at the 1904 Summer Olympics
1904
Olympics
Olympics